The 1946 Utah Redskins football team was an American football team that represented the University of Utah as a member of the Mountain States Conference (MSC) during the 1946 college football season. In their 22nd season under head coach Ike Armstrong, the Redskins compiled an overall record of 8–3 record with a m mark of 4–2 against conference opponents, finished in third place in the MSC, and outscored all opponents by a total of 257 to 114. Utah was invited to the Pineapple Bowl, where they lost to  Hawaii.

The team ranked third nationally in rushing offense, averaging 263.5 rushing yards per game. Barney Hafen led Utah's ground attack and ranked 20th nationally with 577 rushing yards.

Backs Milton Smith and C. Parkinson were selected by the International News Service as first-team players on the 1946 All-Mountain States football team. Ends Van Sandt and Stevens and guard  Barrett were named to the second team.

Schedule

1947 NFL Draft
Utah had one player selected in the 1947 NFL Draft.

References

Utah
Utah Utes football seasons
Utah Redskins football